The following is a partial list of soccer stadiums in the United States. It includes all stadiums in the top three levels of American soccer and some lower league and collegiate stadiums in the United States. The minimum capacity is 1,000.

Some of these venues are soccer-specific stadiums. Other venues are multipurpose stadiums, American football stadiums, or baseball stadiums that also host soccer games.

Current stadiums

See also
List of Major League Soccer stadiums
List of NASL stadiums
List of U.S. stadiums by capacity
List of football (soccer) stadiums by capacity
List of soccer specific stadiums

References